Christopher Wade is a retired real estate broker/owner of Ozarks Realty Company in Flippin, Arkansas. He was the real estate agent associated to the Clinton's Whitewater controversy in Arkansas.

Career
Wade was a real estate broker/owner of Ozarks Realty Company in Flippin, Arkansas. In 1974, Wade was Realtor of the Year in Arkansas.

Personal
Wade's father was Milton Wade, who started in real estate in the 1960s. In February 1971, the Wade family purchased the real estate company. Wade's ex-wife Rosalee is currently the Principal Broker of Ozarks Realty Company.

Whitewater controversy
Chris Wade was the real estate broker for Jim McDougal and Bill Clinton for the Whitewater Development Corporation.  He sold the lots for the Clintons and McDougals.  He ended up buying some of the land from them.  In 1985, Jim McDougal traded the few remaining Whitewater lots to Wade for an airplane and the assumption of $35,000 in bank debt to 1st Ozark. The Clintons and McDougals were still personally obligated on the note. He came into front page national news as a result of the Whitewater investigations.

On March 21, 1995, Wade pleaded guilty to two felony counts including bankruptcy fraud.

Wade entered a guilty plea of one felony violation for making a false report to overvalue property influencing a Bank, S&L, or a federal agencies-bankruptcy fraud to the Whitewater special prosecutor, Kenneth Starr. He was sentenced to 15 months in prison for the loan fraud.

On Jan 20, 2001, President Bill Clinton's last day in office as the President, Wade was pardoned for Bank fraud, false statements on a loan application (18 U.S.C. §§ 152, 1014). With just hours to go in his presidency, Bill Clinton issued a pardon to Chris Wade, which became part of the Bill Clinton pardons controversy.

References

External links
 CNN, All Politics, Arkansas Roots, April 12, 1999
 The Washington Post, Caught in the Whitewater Quagmire, August 28, 1995; Page A01
 The Special Committee's Whitewater Report, Summary of the Evidence
 CNN, All Politics, FBI agent traces money trail at McDougal trial, March 12, 1999

American real estate brokers
Living people
People from Marion County, Arkansas
Recipients of American presidential pardons
Whitewater controversy
1945 births